22nd Motorized Infantry Battalion also known as Kharkiv Battalion is a formation of the Ukrainian Ground Forces that was established as 22nd Territorial Defense Battalion "Kharkiv" in 2014. The battalion is subordinated to the Ministry of Defense. The formation was established in April 2014 in Kharkiv during the outbreak of the Russo-Ukrainian War. The battalion is based in Svatove.
 
At the end of 2014 the 22nd Territorial Defense Battalion was reorganized into the 22nd Motorized Infantry Battalion and transferred to the Land Forces of Ukraine, subordinating it to the 92nd Mechanised Brigade. It has been defending Kharkiv in the 2022 Russian invasion of Ukraine.

References 

History of Luhansk Oblast
History of Kharkiv Oblast
Territorial defence battalions of Ukraine
Military units and formations established in 2014
2014 establishments in Ukraine